The Thomas Mill Covered Bridge, aka the Thomas Mill Bridge or the Thomas Mill Road Covered Bridge, is a historic, single-span, wooden covered bridge across the Wissahickon Creek in Wissahickon Valley Park in Northwest Philadelphia, Pennsylvania.

It was renovated by the Works Progress Administration in 1939, and by the City of Philadelphia in 2000.

It is the only remaining covered bridge in Philadelphia and is the only covered bridge in a major US city. It was listed on the National Register of Historic Places in 1980. It is a Contributing Property of the Chestnut Hill Historic District.

The bridge is open to pedestrian traffic.

References

External links
 
 
 Article at Drexel University
 "A Bridge Too Old", by Amy Choi, Philadelphia Citypaper, August 27–September 3, 1998
 Listing at Philadelphia Architects and Buildings
 Listing and photographs at BridgeHunter.com
 Wood, Stone, and Steel: Bridges in the Wissahickon, Friends of the Wissahickon

Bridges on the National Register of Historic Places in Philadelphia
Historic American Buildings Survey in Philadelphia
Wooden bridges in Pennsylvania
Works Progress Administration in Pennsylvania
Bridges completed in 1855
Philadelphia Register of Historic Places
Wissahickon Valley Park
Chestnut Hill, Philadelphia
Historic district contributing properties in Pennsylvania
Covered bridges on the National Register of Historic Places in Pennsylvania
Road bridges on the National Register of Historic Places in Pennsylvania
Howe truss bridges in the United States